, also known as Kura-no-suke (内蔵助), was a Japanese samurai of the Sengoku through Azuchi–Momoyama period. He entered Nobunaga's service at the age of 14 and remained in his lord's service throughout Nobunaga's rise to power. He was  a member of the so-called Echizen Sanninshu (Echizen Triumvir) along with Maeda Toshiie and Fuwa Mitsuharu.

Early life

Sassa Narimasa was born to Sassa Morimasa.
He was born in what is now Nishi-ku, Nagoya (situated in contemporary Aichi District, Owari Province). He became a retainer of Oda Nobunaga in 1550. Narimasa was a military commander under Nobunaga, and member of "Oda's kurohoroshu" (Oda clan black knights), he noted for his ability to lead matchlock forces, a position he regularly held.

In 1560, after his brothers kill in battle, Narimasa took over the family estate and became the lord of the Hirajo Castle.

Military life
Narimasa served Nobunaga throughout the latter's career. 
In 1567, he fought in the Siege of Inabayama Castle against Saito Tatsuoki from Saitō clan.

In 1570, Narimasa participated in the Siege of Kanegasaki, leading a few armed forces of horse guards and worked to support Hashiba Hideyoshi using firearms troop.
Later, he was fought at the Battle of Anegawa against Azai clan and Asakura clan, where he was in the rear guard.

In 1575, Narimasa fought at the Battle of Nagashino against Takeda Katsuyori from Takeda clan. Later, he was given Komaru Castle in Echizen, where he had recently helped put down rioting Ikkō-ikki, and became a member of Echizen Sanninshu (Echizen Triumvir).

In 1577, he participated in the Battle of Tedorigawa against Uesugi Kenshin from the Uesugi clan.

In 1580, he was involved in stabilizing the Etchu Province, against uprising of Ikko sect followers as a support for Jimbo Nagazumi.

In 1581, he defended Toyama Castle against Kawada Nagayori in the Battle of Arakawa.

In 1582, he and Shibata Katsuie successfully laid siege to Uozu against Uesugi Kagekatsu from the Uesugi clan. He was granted Etchū Province as a reward for helping Shibata Katsuie fight the Uesugi clan. 

In 1583, after Oda Nobunaga's death at Honnō-ji, at the Kiyosu meeting, Narimasa took side of Shibata, but he could not participate in the battle of Shizugatake since he could not leave Etchu due to preparations for the attack of the Uesugi army at Matsukura Castle (Toyama Prefecture). After the death of Katsuie, Narimasa joined Tokugawa Ieyasu.

In 1584, during the battle of Komaki Nagakute, he and the Tokugawa alliance unsuccessfully challenged Toyotomi force under Maeda Toshiie at the Siege of Suemori.
 
In 1585, he was defeated against Toyotomi Hideyoshi at Siege of Toyama, and later Narimasa submitted to Hideyoshi and his life was spared.

In 1587, after Hideyoshi Kyushu Campaign, he was given a fief in Higo Province in Kyushu.

Death
In 1588, however, due to difficulties in suppressing a Higo Province local revolt, he committed suicide (seppuku) by Hideyoshi's instruction. The insurrection stemmed from survey of his province, which resulted in a change in the distance in which farmers transported their tax rice from 3 ri to 8 ri. Later, after Higo Province was confiscated from Sassa Narimasa, land in Higo (roughly half of the province) and Kumamoto Castle granted to Kato Kiyomasa.

Family
 Father: Sassa Morimasa
 Siblings:
 Sassa Magosuke (distinguished as one of the Seven Spears of Azukizaka. Died in Battle of Inabugahara against Oda Nobuyuki; 1556)
 Sassa "Hayato no Kami" Masatsugu (distinguished as one of the Seven Spears of Azukizaka. Died in battle of Okehazama; 1560)
 Wife: 
 Haruhime
 Jiko-in
 Concubine: 
 Sayuri
 Children:
 Matsuchiyomaru (died in third siege of Nagashima in 1574).
 Zuizen-in, wife of Narimasa's vassal, Matsubara Gorobe.
 Teruko (d. 1630), married kuge Takatsukasa Nobufusa and they had a son, Nobuhisa and a daughter, Takako.
 Mitsuhide-in, wife of Nobunaga's seventh son, Oda Nobutaka (Oda Nobutaka by Kyōun'in, later Toyotomi Takajuro (1576–1602) adopted by Toyotomi Hideyoshi)
 Shoju-in, wife of Narimasa's vassal, Jinbo Ujioki.

Notes

See also
Battle of Nagashino

1536 births
1588 deaths
Daimyo
Samurai
Suicides by seppuku
Oda retainers
16th-century suicides